Viscount Hood, of Whitley in the County of Warwick, is a title in the Peerage of Great Britain. It was created in 1796 for the famous naval commander Admiral Samuel Hood, 1st Baron Hood. He had already been created a Baronet, of Catherington, in the Baronetage of Great Britain on 20 May 1778, and Baron Hood, of Catherington in the County of Southampton, in the Peerage of Ireland in 1782.

In 1795, his wife Susannah Linzee was created Baroness Hood, of Catherington in the County of Southampton, in her own right, in the Peerage of Great Britain. They were both succeeded by their son Henry, the second viscount. His grandson, the third viscount, assumed in 1840 by royal licence the additional surname of Tibbits, which was that of his father-in-law. His great-grandson, the sixth viscount, was a diplomat and notably served as Minister at the British Embassy in Washington from 1958 to 1962 and as Deputy Under-Secretary of State at the Foreign Office between 1962 and 1969. , the titles are held by the latter's nephew, the eighth viscount, who succeeded his father in 1999.

Alexander Hood, 1st Viscount Bridport, was the younger brother of the first Viscount Hood. In 1794, he had been created Baron Bridport in the Peerage of Ireland, with remainder to his great-nephew Samuel Hood, the second son of the second Viscount Hood, who succeeded to the barony on Lord Bridport's death in 1814, while the viscountcy became extinct. In 1868, the latter's son, the third baron, was again created Viscount Bridport (see this title for later history of these peerages). Also, Alexander Hood, uncle of the first Viscount Hood and first Viscount Bridport, was the ancestor of the Fuller-Acland-Hood Baronets of St Audries and the Barons St Audries. Rear-Admiral Sir Horace Hood, younger son of the fourth Viscount Hood, was also a distinguished naval commander.

The family seat is Loders Court, near Bridport, Dorset.

Viscounts Hood (1796)
Samuel Hood, 1st Viscount Hood (1724–1816)
Henry Hood, 2nd Viscount Hood (1753–1836)
Samuel Hood-Tibbits, 3rd Viscount Hood (1808–1846)
Francis Wheler Hood, 4th Viscount Hood (1838–1907)
Grosvenor Arthur Alexander Hood, 5th Viscount Hood (1868–1933)
Samuel Hood, 6th Viscount Hood (1910–1981)
Alexander Lambert Hood, 7th Viscount Hood (1914–1999)
Henry Lyttelton Alexander Hood, 8th Viscount Hood (b. 1958)

The heir apparent is the present holder's son, the Hon. Archibald Lyttelton Samuel Hood (b. 1993)

Barons Hood (1795)
Susannah Hood, 1st Baroness Hood (d. 1806)
Henry Hood, 2nd Baron Hood (1753–1836) (succeeded as Viscount Hood in 1816)
see above for later holders

See also
Viscount Bridport
Baron St Audries

References

Books cited

External links
Cracroft's Peerage page

Viscountcies in the Peerage of Great Britain
Noble titles created in 1796
Viscount